3100 W. Big Beaver Road in Troy, Michigan, USA, is the former international headquarters of Kmart Corporation. The building, on the northwest side of the intersection of W. Big Beaver Road and Coolidge Highway, used to employ thousands of people, but has been vacant since 2004.

The building was erected in 1969, designed by Smith, Hinchman, and Grylls, Inc. In 1972, the Kresge company, the precursor of Kmart, moved its headquarters there from Detroit (where its former headquarters is now the Metropolitan Center for High Technology). In 1975 a Michigan historic marker was erected to mark the significance of the company. It was constructed for more than 5,500 headquarters staff. When Kmart purchased Sears and moved its headquarters to Chicago in 2006, the building, then housing 2,000, was vacated; art from the corporate art collection including a tapestry by Picasso and a signed Warhol poster and exhibits from the science and technology collection including a work by Alan Bean signed by US astronauts were sold off.

The 40-acre building is enclosed by nine towers, six smaller, two larger, and one overlooking the rest at the corner nearest the intersection of W. Big Beaver and Coolidge. The tallest tower offers a panoramic view of the surrounding area, including the adjacent Somerset Mall.

The building was sold in December 2005 to Madison Marquette, a development company that planned to use the site for a hotel, condominiums, shopping, offices, and entertainment. It was sold in 2006 for US$40 million. In 2009, The Forbes Company & Frankel Associates, owners of the mall, purchased it from Diamond Troy JV, L.L.C. for an undisclosed price. While the site has remained vacant since 2006, plans to redevelop the site have been proposed. In 2008, a redevelopment project called the Pavilions of Troy proposed to tear down the old building and create an outside shopping mall, but the project was cancelled during the Great Recession.

References

Further reading
 "'S. S. Kresge', Hauptverwaltung in Troy, USA". Der Baumeister 71, November 1974. Thema: Verwaltungsbauten. pp. 1227–30

External links
 Former Kmart Corporation Headquarters (Troy, Michigan) at WikiMapia

Office buildings completed in 1972
Buildings and structures in Troy, Michigan
Unused buildings in Michigan